The Nix Professional Building is a 23-story hospital in downtown San Antonio, Texas, US.

At the time of its completion, this was the largest and tallest hospital in the United States. It was also the only hospital with doctor's offices, hospital beds, and a parking garage all in one building. It currently stands as the 10th tallest building in the city.

See also 
 List of tallest buildings in San Antonio

References 

Hospital buildings completed in 1931
Skyscrapers in San Antonio
Healthcare in San Antonio
Hospitals in Texas
Skyscrapers in Texas